Jean-Yves Li Waut (born 2 July 1978) in Tahiti is a footballer who plays as a defender. He currently plays for AS Manu-Ura in the Tahiti Division Fédérale and the Tahiti national football team.

References

1978 births
Living people
French Polynesian footballers
Tahiti international footballers
Association football defenders
2004 OFC Nations Cup players